Kansapur is a village in Yamuna Nagar, India.  It has a population of about 15,000. It is mainly inhabited by Hindus and Muslims.

Kansapur falls under the Panchayat of Kansapur village and Assembly seat of Yamuna Nagar. Current sarpanch of Kansapur village is SURESH Rana.

References 

Villages in Yamunanagar district